Cockerton is a surname. Notable people with the surname include:

John Cockerton (1927–2015), British Anglican priest and academic
Stan Cockerton (born 1955), Canadian-American lacrosse player